The Dutch ambassador in Ankara is the official representative of the Government in The Hague to the Government of Turkey.

History 
During the Ottoman Empire the envoys where next the Sublime Porte, the central government in Istanbul. Ottoman Empire was succeeded by Turkey and the capital was moved from İstanbul to Ankara.  The title of the head of the state during the Ottoman times was Sultan. In the following list Sultans (Ottoman era) and Prime ministers (Turkish Republic era) are shown.(Turkish Republic was officially proclaimed in 1923)

List of representatives

Ottoman Empire

Turkish Republic

References 

 
Turkey
Netherlands